Eilefsen Peak is a peak in the northeast part of Radford Island, lying in the Sulzberger Ice Shelf off the coast of Marie Byrd Land. The peak was probably seen on an aerial flight by the Byrd Antarctic Expedition (1928–30). It was named by the Advisory Committee on Antarctic Names for Albert Eilefsen, a driver with the Byrd Antarctic Expedition (1933–35).

References 

Mountains of Marie Byrd Land